Willem Huender (30 May 1900 – 7 August 1963) was a Dutch colonial administrator and diplomat, who was Governor of Suriname between 1948 and 1949. Huender submitted his resignation after serving only one year as governor, citing health reasons.

References 

1900 births
1963 deaths
Diplomats from Amsterdam
Governors of Suriname